Glen Martin may refer to:

Glen Martin, New South Wales
Glen W. Martin (1916–1994), American Air Force general
Glen T. Martin, American philosopher

See also
Glenn Martin (disambiguation)

Martin, Geln